NGC 1997 (also known as ESO 86-SC1) is an open cluster located in the Dorado constellation which is part of the Large Magellanic Cloud. It was discovered by John Herschel on November 30, 1834. Its apparent magnitude is 13.43 and its size is 1.80 arc minutes.

References

Open clusters
1997
86-SC1
Dorado (constellation)
Large Magellanic Cloud
Astronomical objects discovered in 1834
Discoveries by John Herschel